The People's Voice is an Israeli-Palestinian civil initiative dedicated to advancing the process of achieving peace between Israel and the Palestinians. Co-founders Ami Ayalon, former head of the Shin Bet and Sari Nusseibeh signed the initiative on 27 July 2002, and officially launched it at a press conference held in Tel-Aviv on 25 June 2003. Broad outlines and some details of the initiative were known months in advance and had engendered responses from competing proposals.

The key proposals of the initiative are:
 Two states for two peoples.
 Borders based upon the June 4, 1967 lines.
 Jerusalem will be an open city, the capital of two states.
 Palestinian refugees will return only to the Palestinian state.
 Palestine will be demilitarized.

Upon the full implementation of these principles, all claims on both sides and the Israeli–Palestinian conflict will end.

Unlike a number of other proposals, the initiative seeks to resolve the conflict in a single agreement. No phased or interim steps are envisioned.

The initiative seeks to affect the political process by petition, seeking the signatures of enough residents of the area on all sides of the conflict to drive the leaders of the various sides to concluding a peace agreement. The People's Voice website reported on 26 January 2004, 156,000 Israelis and 100,000 Palestinians having signed the initiative. In late 2007 the website went off-line. The Hebrew part went back on-line in 2008, and on 11 October 2008 reported 251,000 Israelis and 160,000 Palestinians having signed.

Arab–Israeli peace diplomacy and treaties
 Geneva Accord
 Paris Peace Conference, 1919
 Faisal–Weizmann Agreement (1919)
 1949 Armistice Agreements
 Camp David Accords (1978)
 Egypt–Israel peace treaty (1979)
 Madrid Conference of 1991
 Oslo Accords (1993)
 Israel–Jordan peace treaty (1994)
 Camp David 2000 Summit
 Israeli–Palestinian peace process
 Projects working for peace among Israelis and Arabs
 List of Middle East peace proposals
 International law and the Arab–Israeli conflict

External links
 Statement of Principles – Signed by Ami Ayalon & Sari Nusseibeh on July 27, 2002 ReliefWeb
 The Ayalon – Nusseibeh "Peoples' Voice" – a critical reading, Gush Shalom, 16 March 2003

Israeli–Palestinian peace process
Political organizations based in Israel
Non-governmental organizations involved in the Israeli–Palestinian peace process
Two-state solution